The English International School of Padua (EISP) is a private independent international school located in Padua, Italy. It enrolls students from pre-school to grade 12 and comprises 3 departments:

Early Years 3-6
Elementary 6-11
Secondary 11-18

The Curriculum followed is based upon both the Italian and the British national curricula until grade 8, and on the IGCSE programme for grades 9 and 10. Certified by Cambridge International Examinations.  The final two years prepare students for the International Baccalaureate Diploma (IB).
EISP is an IB world school and an ECIS member, and is also qualified to carry out SAT examinations.

External links

Cambridge schools in Italy
International Baccalaureate schools in Italy
Educational institutions established in 1987
Private schools in Italy
International schools in Italy
Education in Padua
1987 establishments in Italy
Schools in Veneto